Stine Bredal Oftedal (born 25 September 1991) is a Norwegian handball player for Győri ETO KC and the Norwegian national team, where she is the team captain.

She was voted World Handball Player of the Year 2019 by the International Handball Federation.

She hails from Nittedal and started her career in Nit/Hak HK. She then continued to Fjellhammer IL before continuing to Helset IF. Helset is a feeder team for Stabæk Håndball, and so she has played for Stabæk since the 2008–09 season while still being registered in Helset.

She studied at BI Norwegian Business School. Previously she competed for Nittedal IL in the javelin throw, throwing 32.08 m at the age 13.

Achievements

National team
Olympic Games:
Bronze Medalist: 2016, 2020
World Championship:
Winner: 2011, 2015, 2021
Silver Medalist: 2017
European Championship:
Winner: 2010, 2014, 2016, 2020, 2022
Silver Medalist: 2012
Junior World Championship:
Winner: 2010
Junior European Championship:
Winner: 2009

European
EHF Champions League:
Winner: 2018, 2019
Finalist:  2022
Bronze medalist: 2021

Domestic
Nemzeti Bajnokság I
Winner: 2018, 2019, 2022
Hungarian Cup:
Winner: 2018, 2019, 2021
Norwegian Cup:
Finalist: 2011, 2012

Individual awards
 IHF World Player of the Year: 2019
 All-Star Left Wing of the U18 European Open: 2008
 All-Star Centre Back of the Junior World Championship: 2010
 All-Star Centre Back of Postenligaen: 2010/2011
French Championship MVP: 2014
 All-Star Centre Back of the World Championship: 2015
French Championship Best Playmaker: 2014, 2016
 Most Valuable Player of the World Championship: 2017
 All-Star Centre Back of the European Championship: 2018, 2020, 2022
 All-Star Centre Back of the EHF Champions League: 2019, 2020, 2021, 2022
 Handball-Planet.com All-Star Centre Back of the Year: 2019
 Foreign Handballer of the Year in Hungary: 2019

Personal life
She is the older sister of fellow handball player Hanna Bredal Oftedal.

She is in a relationship with fellow handballer, Rune Dahmke.

References

External links
 
 
 Stine Bredal Oftedal at the Norwegian Handball Federation 
 
 

1991 births
Living people
Handball players from Oslo
People from Nittedal
Norwegian female handball players
Norwegian expatriate sportspeople in France
Norwegian expatriate sportspeople in Hungary
Expatriate handball players
Handball players at the 2016 Summer Olympics
Olympic handball players of Norway
Olympic bronze medalists for Norway
Medalists at the 2016 Summer Olympics
Olympic medalists in handball
Győri Audi ETO KC players
Handball players at the 2020 Summer Olympics
Medalists at the 2020 Summer Olympics
21st-century Norwegian women